Miracle Star is a Chinese children's animated Comedy series created by Chinese food company Sanyuan Foods to promote a brand of goat milk of the same name. The show is best known for being a rip-off of the British-American Cartoon Network show The Amazing World of Gumball.

The series is about an anthropomorphic goat named Miao Li Xing (famously referred as Kiki) and his talking pet frog named Gua-Gua (famously referred to as Quack) who lives in an apartment with their parents. Miracle Star is known for imitating the scenes, character designs and animation style of The Amazing World of Gumball.

The series aired from 2014 to 2017, with a total of 12 episodes broadcast before being cancelled due to negative reviews.

In response to the copyright plagiarism, Cartoon Network released the 167th episode of Gumball, "The Copycats", to address Miracle Star plagiarism more directly.

References

2014 Chinese television series debuts
2017 Chinese television series endings
Animation controversies in television
Chinese children's animated comedy television series
Chinese children's animated fantasy television series
Chinese-language television shows
Chinese television series
Chinese television series by decade
Chinese animated television series
Computer-animated television series
Controversies in China
Surreal comedy television series
Television controversies in China
Television shows involved in plagiarism controversies
The Amazing World of Gumball